Micrelenchus purpureus, common name the red opal top shell, is a species of medium-sized sea snail, a marine gastropod mollusc in the family Trochidae.

Description
The length of the shell varies between 16 mm and 32 mm. It grazes on seaweed.

Distribution
This marine species occurs off North Island and South Island, New Zealand.

References

 Kiener, L.C. (1850). Genre Trochus (plates only). Spécies général et iconographie des coquilles vivantes. 11. Rousseau & Baillière, Paris.
 Hombron J. B. & Jacquinot H. (1848 [March]). Atlas d'Histoire Naturelle. Zoologie par MM. Hombron et Jacquinot, chirurgiens de l'expédition. in: Voyage au pole sud et dans l'Océanie sur les corvettes l'Astrolabe et la Zélée pendant les années 1837-1838-1839-1840 sous le commandement de M. Dumont-D'Urville capitaine de vaisseau publié sous les auspices du département de la marine et sous la direction supérieure de M. Jacquinot, capitaine de Vaisseau, commandant de La Zélée. Vingt-quatriéme livraison. Insectes lépidoptéres pls 1,2; Mollusques pls 9, 11, 12.

External links
 
 Gmelin J.F. (1791). Vermes. In: Gmelin J.F. (Ed.) Caroli a Linnaei Systema Naturae per Regna Tria Naturae, Ed. 13. Tome 1(6). G.E. Beer, Lipsiae [Leipzig]. pp. 3021-3910
 Menke, K. T. (1828). Synopsis methodica molluscorum generum omnium et specierum earum, quae in Museo Menkeano adservantur; cum synonymia critica et novarum specierum diagnosibus. XII + 91 pp.
 Gould A.A. (1849). [Descriptions of new species of shells, brought home by the U. S. Exploring Expedition]. Proceedings of the Boston Society of Natural History. 3: 83-85, 89-92, 106-108, 118-121 [May 1849], 140-144

Further reading 
 Powell A. W. B., New Zealand Mollusca, p. 55; William Collins Publishers Ltd, Auckland, New Zealand 1979 
 Marshall, B.A. 1998: The New Zealand Recent species of Cantharidus Montfort, 1810 and Micrelenchus Finlay, 1926 (Mollusca: Gastropoda: Trochidae). Molluscan Research 19: 107-156 (p. 114)

purpureus
Gastropods of New Zealand
Gastropods described in 1791